Nicolás Vergallo (born 20 August 1983 in Rosario) is an Argentine and Italian rugby union footballer, currently playing in France for Lyon. He plays at scrum-half.

Career

Club
He played for Jockey Club de Rosario in Argentina between 2004 and 2008.  He then moved to France, where he played for Dax, making 47 appearances.

Toulouse
After playing for Dax, he then signed for Top 14 team Toulouse, winning the 2010–11 and 2011–12 Top 14 seasons.

Kings
In October 2012, Toulouse announced that it had released Vergallo from his contract, which was supposed to end in 2014. This freed him up to sign with the Port Elizabeth-based Super Rugby franchise, the Southern Kings. Vergallo was the second-choice scrum-half for the  during the 2013 Super Rugby season behind Shaun Venter.

At the conclusion of the Super Rugby season, it initially looked as if he would remain at the Kings – he was named in the  squad for the 2013 Currie Cup First Division season and made five starts for them in that competition, but he then left the team to join French Pro D2 side Lyon.

International
He made his debut for Argentina on 3 Dec 2005 against Samoa. He also played in the 2011 Rugby World Cup. In 2012 Vergallo was part of the Pumas team that played in the inaugural Rugby Championship.

References

1983 births
Living people
Argentine people of Italian descent
Argentine rugby union players
Argentina international rugby union players
Sportspeople from Rosario, Santa Fe
Rugby union scrum-halves
US Dax players
Stade Toulousain players
Eastern Province Elephants players
Southern Kings players
Argentine expatriate rugby union players
Expatriate rugby union players in France
Expatriate rugby union players in South Africa
Argentine expatriate sportspeople in South Africa
Argentine expatriate sportspeople in France